"New Way Home" is a song by Finnish pop singer Isac Elliot. The song was released as a digital download on 14 February 2013 as the lead single from his debut studio album Wake Up World (2013). The song peaked at number one on the Official Finnish Singles Chart.

Music video
A music video to accompany the release of "New Way Home" was first released onto YouTube on 4 April 2013 at a total length of three minutes and forty-three seconds.

Track listing

Chart performance

Release history

References

2013 singles
Isac Elliot songs
Number-one singles in Finland
Songs written by Joonas Angeria
Songs written by Ilan Kidron
2013 songs
Sony Music singles